Clastoptera lawsoni is a species in the superfamily Cercopoidea ("spittlebugs"), in the order Hemiptera ("true bugs, cicadas, hoppers, aphids and allies").
It is found in North America.

References

Further reading
 Doering, Kathleen C. (1928). "The Genus Clastoptera in America North of Mexico". The University of Kansas Science Bulletin, vol. 18, no. 1, 5–154.
 Maw, H. E. L., R. G. Foottit, K. G. A. Hamilton, and G. G. E. Scudder (2000). Checklist of the Hemiptera of Canada and Alaska, viii + 220.
 Ross H. Arnett. (2000). American Insects: A Handbook of the Insects of America North of Mexico. CRC Press.

Insects described in 1929
Clastopteridae